Prospero Spínola (1587–1664) was a Roman Catholic prelate who served as Bishop of Luni e Sarzana (1637–1664).

Biography
Prospero Spínola was born in 1587 in Genoa, Italy.
On 7 September 1637, he was appointed during the papacy of Pope Urban VIII as Bishop of Luni e Sarzana.
On 25 October 1637, he was consecrated bishop by Bernardino Spada, Cardinal-Priest of Santo Stefano al Monte Celio, with Ottavio Corsini, Titular Archbishop of Tarsus, and Biagio Proto de Rossi, Archbishop of Messina, serving as co-consecrators. 
He served as Bishop of Luni e Sarzana until his death in 1664.

References

External links and additional sources
 (for Chronology of Bishops) 
 (for Chronology of Bishops) 

17th-century Italian Roman Catholic bishops
Bishops appointed by Pope Urban VIII
1664 deaths
1587 births